An apex predator is a predator residing at the top of a food chain on which no other creatures prey.

Apex Predator may also refer to:

Music 
 Apex Predator (Crooked I album) or its title track "Apex Predator (My Gun Go)"
 Apex Predator – Easy Meat, a 2015 album by Napalm Death, or its title track
 "Apex Predator", a 2013 song by Otep from Hydra
 "Apex Predator", a 2014 song by Cavalera Conspiracy from Pandemonium

Other uses
 Randy Orton or The Apex Predator (born 1980), American professional wrestler
 Apex Predator, a beer brewed by Off Color Brewing
 Apex Predators, a mercenary group in Titanfall 2
 Apex Predator, a rank in Apex Legends

See also
 Predator (disambiguation)
 Superpredators (disambiguation)